The Show What You Wrote is a BBC Radio 4 comedy sketch show made entirely from material sent in by the show's listeners.

See also
You Wrote It, You Watch It

References

BBC Radio comedy programmes
English-language radio programs
2013 radio programme debuts